The Akademi Kreyòl Ayisyen, known in French as the Académie du Créole Haïtien and in English as the Haitian Creole Academy, is the language regulator of Haitian Creole. It is composed of up to 55scholars under the leadership of Pierre-André Pierre.

Background
The Haitian Creole language did not have any regulation until the 1940s, when former Haitian president, Élie Lescot made attempts at standardizing the language. It had an official orthography by the late 1970s, and it was elevated to co-official language with French in the 1987 Haitian Constitution. The constitution, in Article 213, stated that a Haitian creole language academy should be founded. The language still lacked an academy to regulate its evolution until about 25 years later.

History
In December 2014, the Haitian president and legislation approved of the establishment of the Haitian Creole Academy. 33 scholars came together and formed the organization to form a uniform syntax, to ensure the Haitian government is able to better communicate with its people, lead the way for more publications of books and various other forms of media, and to end the stigma behind speaking the language.

In 2017, Renauld Govain, dean of the Faculty of Applied Linguistics at the State University of Haiti, criticized the Akademi's first resolution, saying it confused orthography, alphabet and spelling.

Members
The  allows for anywhere from 33 to 55or members. , they included the following:

Former members
 Max Gesner Beauvoir 
 Rachel Beauvoir Dominique 
 Marie Marcelle Buteau Racine

References

External links

Haitian Creole
Language regulators
Learned societies of Haiti
Haiti
Organizations established in 2014
2014 establishments in Haiti